Orus may refer to:

People
 Orus, also known as Oros of Alexandria
 Orus Jones (1867–1963), American golfer

Places
 Orus, Ariège, France

Other
 21900 Orus, minor planet
 Lycaena orus, butterfly of the family Lycaenidae